Sneland I (Norwegian for “snowland one”) was a  cargo ship which was built by Nüscke & Co. shipyard at Stettin-Grabow (then Germany) in 1922. She was the last merchant ship to be torpedoed by Germany in the Second World War, on 7 May 1945, one day before German surrender.

History
The ship was built for the German shipping line Stange & Dreyer GmbH in 1922 and got the name Ingeborg. Three years later, in 1925, it was sold to the Norwegian shipping company Richard Amlie & Sverre Amlie (Amlie & Amlie) in Haugesund, and renamed Sneland I.

On 6 May 1945 the ship was a member of Convoy EN 491, which departed Hull bound for Belfast via Methil. The sinking, at about 22:45 on 7 May 1945, was in the last hours of the Second World War in Europe, with the official surrender taking place at 23:01 on 8 May 1945.

Seven of the 29 crew were lost.
A signal had been sent to the U-boats on 4 May 1945 ordering them to surrender but U-2336 did not receive the signal.

See also
 Actions of 7–8 May 1945

External links
Image of Sneland I

References

1922 ships
Ships of Nortraship
Steamships of Norway
World War II merchant ships of Norway
Ships sunk by German submarines in World War II
World War II shipwrecks in the North Sea
Maritime incidents in May 1945